The Aurora Awards are granted annually by the Canadian SF and Fantasy Association and SFSF Boreal Inc. The Award for Best Graphic Novel (French: Meilleure bande dessinée) was first awarded in 2011 as a category for both the English-language awards and introduced to the French-language awards in 2017.

Ellipsis Stephens and Peter Chiykowski have won the English-language award the most number of times at 2 times each.

English-language Award

Winners and nominees

  *   Winners and joint winners

French-language Award

Winners and nominees

  *   Winners and joint winners

References

Graphic Novel